Marieta Riera (born 23 December 1963) is a retired Venezuelan track and field athlete who competed in the women's javelin throw competition during her career.

Achievements

External links
 

1963 births
Living people
Venezuelan female javelin throwers
Pan American Games bronze medalists for Venezuela
Pan American Games medalists in athletics (track and field)
Athletes (track and field) at the 1983 Pan American Games
Athletes (track and field) at the 1987 Pan American Games
Athletes (track and field) at the 1991 Pan American Games
South American Games silver medalists for Venezuela
South American Games medalists in athletics
Competitors at the 1994 South American Games
Central American and Caribbean Games bronze medalists for Venezuela
Competitors at the 1982 Central American and Caribbean Games
Competitors at the 1990 Central American and Caribbean Games
Central American and Caribbean Games medalists in athletics
Medalists at the 1983 Pan American Games
Medalists at the 1987 Pan American Games
20th-century Venezuelan women
21st-century Venezuelan women